Marshall Scott is an Australian former professional rugby league footballer who played in the 1990s. He played for Balmain and Western Suburbs in the NRL competition.

Playing career
Scott made his first grade debut for Balmain in round 13 of the 1997 ARL season against Illawarra at WIN Stadium. Scott made one further appearance that year against Western Suburbs. In the 1998 NRL season, Scott made eight appearances for the Balmain club. In 1999, Scott joined Western Suburbs and made one appearance for the club which was in round 3 against Penrith at Penrith Stadium with the match finishing in a 60–6 loss. This would be Scott's last game in the top grade and he was not offered a contract to join the newly merged team Wests Tigers ahead of the 2000 NRL season.

References

1975 births
Western Suburbs Magpies players
Balmain Tigers players
Australian rugby league players
Rugby league wingers
Living people